Colin Radmore (born 1984) is a British slalom canoeist who competed at the international level from 2002 to 2010. Radmore specialized on the C1 class in the early part of his career, but switched to C2 in 2009, creating a partnership with Daniel Goddard.

He won a bronze medal in the C2 team event at the 2009 ICF Canoe Slalom World Championships in La Seu d'Urgell. He also won a silver and a bronze in the same event at the European Championships.

World Cup individual podiums

1 Oceania Canoe Slalom Open counting for World Cup points

References

12 September 2009 final results for the men's C2 team slalom event for the 2009 ICF Canoe Slalom World Championships. - accessed 12 September 2009.

British male canoeists
Living people
1984 births
Place of birth missing (living people)
Medalists at the ICF Canoe Slalom World Championships